Anna Wise (born February 16, 1991) is an American singer, who has independently released music as a member of bands Sonnymoon and Built to Fade. She became more widely known for her collaborations with rapper Kendrick Lamar and hip hop group CunninLynguists. She won a Grammy Award for her collaboration with Lamar, "These Walls".

Wise began her musical career with the band Sonnymoon, a collaboration with Dane Orr, who she met while studying at Berklee College of Music.

She was a part of the group Built to Fade alongside Dane Ferguson, Zoë Wick and Kno of CunninLynguists. While Wise was touring with Sonnymoon, Kendrick Lamar contacted her after hearing her music on YouTube through another emcee, Tunji. She now has become a regular collaborator with Lamar, appearing on 11 tracks. Since 2016, she has released three solo albums.

Discography

Studio albums

Extended plays

Singles

Awards and nominations

References

External links

1991 births
Living people
21st-century American women singers
Place of birth missing (living people)
Berklee College of Music alumni
21st-century American singers